Observation Island is one of the many uninhabited Canadian arctic islands in Qikiqtaaluk Region, Nunavut. It is located at the confluence of Hudson Strait and the Labrador Sea.

Other islands in the immediate vicinity include Holdridge Island, Lawson Island, Leading Island, and MacColl Island.

References 

Islands of Hudson Strait
Islands of the Labrador Sea
Uninhabited islands of Qikiqtaaluk Region